Julia McNair Wright (McNair; May 1, 1840 – September 2, 1903) was a popular 19th-century American domestic writer. She published numerous temperance and anti-Catholic stories, among which were Almost a Nun; Priest and Nun; The Gospel in the Riviera; The Heir of Athole, Scenes of the Convent; A Wife Hard Won; A Million Too Much; The Complete Home; Bricks from Babel; as well as scientific stories entitled, The Sun and His Family; The Story of Plant Life; The Nature Readers, Seaside and Wayside. She was the main author of Ladies' Home Cook Book: A Complete Cook Book and Manual of Household Duties... Compiled by Julia Mac Nair Wright, et al. (532 pages). Wright died in 1903.

Early life and education
Julia McNair was born in Oswego, New York, May 1, 1840. She was the daughter of John McNair, a civil engineer of Scotch descent. She was carefully educated in private schools and seminaries.

Career
In 1859, she married Rev. Dr. William James Wright, the mathematician. She began her literary career at age sixteen by the publication of short stories. Her published works include Almost a Nun (1867); Priest and Nun (1869); Jug-or-Not (1870); Saints and Sinners (1873); The Early Church in Britain (1874); Bricks from Babel, a manual of ethnography (1876); The Complete Home (1879); A Wife Hard Won, a novel (1882). 

Julia McNair Wright's The Field Of Fortune or Practical Life is a 626 page tutorial on the value of Common Sense in all of life's pursuits. The volume's themes are presented by a newcomer visiting the general store/post office in Arcadia, a fictional American town. 'The Stranger' expounds on the value of dedication, hard work and familial love, addressing small groups of the town's elders as well as the young folk, with questions asked, answers offered, and comments/retorts welcomed and discussed.

She also produced The Nature Readers, four volumes (1887–91). Her works were very popular. Most of her stories were republished in Europe, in various languages, and several of them appeared in Arabic. Wright never had a book that was a financial failure; all did well. The Complete Home sold over 100,000 copies, and others reached ten, twenty, thirty and fifty thousand. Since the organization of the National Temperance Society, she was one of its most earnest workers and most popular authors. She wrote on historical, nature, ethnographical, theological, and biblical subjects.

Personal life
She had two children. Her son was a businessman; her daughter, Mrs. J. Wright Whitcomb, a member of the Kansas bar, was an author.

Julia McNair Wright died September 2, 1903 in Philadelphia, Pennsylvania, or Fulton, Missouri.

Selected works
 George Miller and his mother, 1860
 Mary Reed, 1861
 Blind Annie Lorimer, 1863
 Life and light, or, Every-day religion, 1863
 Biddy Malone : or, The bundle of silk, 1863
 Nannie Barton, 1864
 The cap-makers, 1864
 The little Norwegian, and the young wood-cutter : true stories 1865
 New York Ned, or, Wreck and refuge, 1865
 The path and the lamp 1865
 The convict's family, 1865
 Malcom's cottage and Malcom's friend, 1867
 Old Michael and his little friend, 1867
 The golden heart, 1867
 Mabel and Tura of the Southwest : a tale, 1867
 Shoe-binders of New York, or, The fields white to the harvest, 1867
 The New York needle-woman, or, Elsie's stars, 1868
 The golden fruit, 1868
 The Golden life, 1867
 New York needle-woman, or, Elsie's stars, 1868
 Richard Knill, 1869
 The Ohio ark ; and where it floated, 1869
 The story of a tinker, 1869
 The New York Bible-woman, 1869
 Henry Martyn, 1869
 The little king, 1869
 Three seats full, 1869
 The Indian's friend, 1869
 Our class, 1869
 Story of a prophet, 1869
 Tom Scott, 1869
 Brave Max, 1869
 Good Louise, 1869
 Henry Martyn, 1869
 Priest and nun, 1869
Melanchthon, 1870
 A million too much, a temperance tale, 1871
 A made man : a sequel to "The story of Rasmus ; or, the making of a man" ...
 A plain woman's story, 1890

References

Attribution

Bibliography

External links
 

1840 births
1903 deaths
People from Oswego, New York
Writers from New York (state)
19th-century American writers
19th-century American women writers
American religious writers
Women religious writers
American cookbook writers
Wikipedia articles incorporating text from A Woman of the Century